The following are the handball events of the year 2012 throughout the world. Tournaments include international, professional (club), youth and amateur levels.

National Teams

International Tournaments
2012 Summer Olympics:
Men:      
Women:

Continental Tournaments
African Championships:
Men:      
Women:      
Asian Championships:
Men:      
Women:      
European Championships:
Men:      
Women:      
Oceania Championships:
Men:    
Pan American Championships:
Men:

Youth Tournaments
Women's Youth World Championship:      
Women's Junior World Championship:      
Americas
Pan American Women's Youth Championship:      
Pan American Women's Junior Championship:      
Asia
Asian Men's Junior Championship:

Club Teams

International Tournaments
IHF Super Globe:   Atlético Madrid   THW Kiel   Al Sadd

Continental Tournaments
Africa
Men
African Handball Cup Winners' Cup:   ES Sahel H.C   Zamalek SC   Club Africain HB
African Handball Super Cup:   Zamalek S.C   FAP Yaoundé
Europe
Men
EHF Champions League:   THW Kiel   Atlético Madrid   AG København
EHF Cup:   Frisch Auf Göppingen   Dunkerque HB Grand Littoral   Rhein-Neckar Löwen/ SC Magdeburg
EHF Challenge Cup:   AC Diomidis Argous   Wacker Thun   Maccabi Tel Aviv/ Sporting CP
Women
EHF Champions League:   Budućnost Podgorica   Győri Audi ETO KC   CS Oltchim Rm. Vâlcea/ Larvik HK
EHF Cup Winners' Cup:   FTC-Rail Cargo Hungaria   Viborg HK   HC Dinamo Volgograd/ HC Leipzig
EHF Cup:   Lada Togliatti   Zalău   Vejen/ Mar Alicante
EHF Challenge Cup:   Le Havre   Muratpasa   Fleury/ Lokomotiva Zagreb

National Championships

Beach Handball
Beach Handball World Championships
Men:      
Women:      
Asian Beach Games
Men:      
Women: